Carlos Eduardo Salazar is a former Argentine Senator for Tucumán Province. He is a member of Fuerza Republicana, a provincial political party founded by former general Antonio Bussi.

Salazar became a Senator in 2007 when Ricardo Bussi left the Senate to return to Tucumán as a state legislator. Prior to his election, Salazar was largely unknown and had not had a political career. He had been cardiologist to Bussi's father, General Antonio Bussi, former governor of Tucumán.

External links
Senate profile

References

Living people
Members of the Argentine Senate for Tucumán
People from Tucumán Province
Fuerza Republicana politicians
Year of birth missing (living people)